Elizabeth Alexander (born May 30, 1962) is an American poet, essayist, playwright, and the president of the Andrew W. Mellon Foundation since 2018.  Previously she was a professor for 15 years at Yale University, where she taught poetry and chaired the African American studies department. In 2015, she was appointed director of creativity and free expression at the Ford Foundation. She then joined the faculty of Columbia University in 2016, as the Wun Tsun Tam Mellon Professor in the Humanities in the Department of English and Comparative Literature.

Early life
Alexander was born in Harlem, New York City, and grew up in Washington, D.C. She is the daughter of former United States Secretary of the Army and Equal Employment Opportunity Commission Chairman Clifford Alexander, Jr. and Adele Logan Alexander, a professor of African-American women's history at George Washington University and writer. Her brother Mark C. Alexander was a senior adviser to the Barack Obama presidential campaign and a member of the president-elect's transition team.
After she was born, the family moved to Washington, D.C. She was just a toddler when her parents took her in August 1963 to the March on Washington site of Martin Luther King Jr.'s famous "I Have A Dream" speech. Alexander recalled that "Politics was in the drinking water at my house". She also took ballet as a child.

She was educated at Sidwell Friends School, and graduated in 1980. From there she went to Yale University and graduated with a bachelor's degree in 1984. She studied poetry at Boston University under Derek Walcott and got her Master's in 1987. Her mother said to her, "That poet you love, Derek Walcott, is teaching at Boston University. Why don't you apply?" Alexander originally entered studying fiction writing, but Walcott looked at her diary and saw the poetry potential. Alexander said, "He gave me a huge gift. He took a cluster of words and he lineated it. And I saw it."

In 1992, she received her PhD in English from the University of Pennsylvania. While she was finishing her degree, she taught at nearby Haverford College from 1990 to 1991. At this time, she would publish her first work, The Venus Hottentot. The title comes from Sarah Baartman, a 19th-century South African woman of the Khoikhoi ethnic group. Alexander is an alumna of the Ragdale Foundation.

After college
While a graduate student, she was a reporter for The Washington Post from 1984 to 1985. She soon realized that "it wasn't the life I wanted." She began teaching at University of Chicago in 1991 as an assistant professor of English. Here she would first meet future president Barack Obama, who was a senior lecturer at the school's law school from 1992 until his election to the U.S. Senate in 2004. While in Chicago in 1992, she won a creative writing fellowship from the National Endowment for the Arts.

In 1996, she published a volume of poetry, Body of Life, and a verse play, Diva Studies, which was staged at Yale University. She also became a founding faculty member of the Cave Canem workshop which helps develop African-American poets. In 1997, she received the University of Chicago's Quantrell Award for excellence in undergraduate teaching. Later in that year, she moved to Massachusetts to teach at Smith College. She became the Grace Hazard Conkling poet-in-residence and the first director of the college's Poetry Center.

In 2000, she returned to Yale University, where she would teach African American studies and English. She also released her third poetry collection, Antebellum Dream Book.

In 2005, she was selected in the first class of Alphonse Fletcher Foundation fellows and in 2007–08, she was an academic fellow at the Radcliffe Institute for Advanced Study at Harvard.

In 2007, Alexander became the first recipient of the Jackson Poetry Prize, an annual prize awarded by Poets & Writers that "honors an American poet of exceptional talent who deserves wider recognition."

Since 2008, Alexander has chaired the African American Studies department at Yale University. She currently teaches English language/literature, African-American literature and gender studies at Yale.

In 2015, Alexander was elected a Chancellor of the Academy of American Poets.

In 2016, she became the Wun Tsun Tam Mellon Professor in the Humanities at Columbia University.

She was awarded an honorary Doctor of Letters degree by Yale University in 2018.

She was elected to the American Academy of Arts and Sciences in 2019.

In 2020 she was elected to the American Philosophical Society.

Works
Alexander's poems, short stories and critical writings have been widely published in such journals and periodicals such as: The Paris Review, American Poetry Review, The Kenyon Review, The Village Voice, The Women's Review of Books, and The Washington Post. Her play Diva Studies, which was performed at the Yale School of Drama, garnered her a National Endowment for the Arts creative writing fellowship as well as an Illinois Arts Council award.

Her 2005 volume of poetry American Sublime was one of three finalists for the Pulitzer Prize of that year. Alexander is also a scholar of African-American literature and culture and recently published a collection of essays entitled The Black Interior.

Alexander received the Anisfield-Wolf Book Award Lifetime Achievement Award in Poetry in 2010.

2009 U.S. presidential inauguration
On January 20, 2009, at the presidential inauguration of Barack Obama, Alexander recited her poem "Praise Song for the Day", which she had composed for the occasion. She became only the fourth poet to read at an American presidential inauguration, after Robert Frost in 1961, Maya Angelou in 1993 and Miller Williams in 1997.

The announcement of her selection was favorably received by her fellow poets Maya Angelou, Rita Dove, Paul Muldoon, and Jay Parini, who extolled her as "smart, deeply educated in the traditions of poetry, true to her roots, responsive to black culture." The Poetry Foundation also hailed the choice: "Her selection affirms poetry's central place in the soul of our country."

Though the selection of the widely unknown poet, who was a personal friend of Obama, was lauded, the actual poem and delivery were met with a poor reception. the Chicago Tribune, the Los Angeles Times Book editor, and most critics found that "her poem was too much like prose," and that "her delivery [was] insufficiently dramatic." Adam Kirsch of The New Republic found the poem "dull, 'bureaucratic' and found it proved that 'the poet's place is not on the platform but in the crowd, that she should speak not for the people but to them.'"

Alexander wrote of her experience of reading at the inauguration in The New Yorker in January 2017. Alexander brought her father, who had attended the 1963 March on Washington for Jobs and Freedom, to sit next to her at the inauguration. At the rehearsal for the inauguration, Alexander read Gwendolyn Brooks's poem "kitchenette building".

Personal life
Alexander's mother is a member of the Logan family, a part of the old African-American upper class. Her grandfather was Dr. Arthur C. Logan and her greataunt was Dr. Myra Adele Logan.
 
Alexander was married to Ficre Ghebreyesus until his death in April 2012. She lives with their two sons in New York City.  In 2010, Alexander participated in Henry Louis Gates, Jr.'s PBS series Faces of America, which explored her ancestry and analyzed her DNA.

Bibliography

Poetry
Collections
 
 
 
 
 
 
 
 
List of poems

Essays and introductions

Memoirs

Critical studies and reviews of Alexander's work
  Review of The Light of the World.

References

External links

Poems by Elizabeth Alexander and biography at PoetryFoundation.org
Elizabeth Alexander: Profile and Poems at Poets.org
Official site of Elizabeth Alexander
Quantrell Award: Elizabeth Alexander
California Newsreel: Elizabeth Alexander
Elizabeth Alexander's profile
"Natasha Trethewey Interviews Elizabeth Alexander", Southern Spaces, December 10, 2009.

1962 births
Living people
20th-century American dramatists and playwrights
20th-century American essayists
20th-century American poets
20th-century American women writers
21st-century American essayists
21st-century American poets
21st-century American women writers
African-American academics
African-American dramatists and playwrights
African-American educators
African-American poets
Black studies scholars
American academic administrators
American women dramatists and playwrights
American women essayists
American women poets
Boston University alumni
Fellows of the American Academy of Arts and Sciences
Harvard University faculty
Haverford College faculty
The New Yorker people
Poets from Washington, D.C.
Radcliffe fellows
Sidwell Friends School alumni
Smith College faculty
University of Chicago faculty
University of Pennsylvania School of Arts and Sciences alumni
American women academics
Writers from New York City
Yale University alumni
Yale University faculty
Members of the American Philosophical Society
American inaugural poets
20th-century African-American women writers
20th-century African-American writers
21st-century African-American women writers
21st-century African-American writers
Andrew W. Mellon Foundation